Mattia Sprocati (born 28 April 1993) is an Italian professional footballer who plays as a midfielder.

Career
Sprocati joined Parma on loan from Pavia in January 2012. He went on to sign for the Serie A club in a definitive deal on 2 July in the same year and was immediately loaned out to Reggiana.

On 10 July 2014, he was signed by Crotone.

Pro Vercelli
On 14 January 2015, Sprocati moved to Pro Vercelli from Crotone in a temporary deal, with Kelvin Matute moved to opposite direction temporary. On 2 July Pro Vercelli signed Sprocati outright from Parma, in a three-year contract.

On 30 January 2017, he was signed by Salernitana in a temporary deal.

Lazio & Parma
On 29 June 2018, Sprocati moved to Lazio on a five-year contract. On 17 August 2018, Sprocati was loaned to Parma with an option to buy.

Parma redeemed the player at the end of the season. Sprocati started the 2019–20 season well, scoring four goals in a 14–1 pre-season win against ASV Prad. He made only one league appearance in the 2020–21 season, was removed from Parma's squad in February 2021 and did not appear from the club for the rest of his contract.

Südtirol
On 4 July 2022, Sprocati joined Südtirol on a one-season contract, with an option to extend for two more years. On 28 November 2022, Sprocati had his contract terminated by mutual consent.

References

External links

Living people
1993 births
Sportspeople from Monza
Association football defenders
Italian footballers
F.C. Pavia players
Parma Calcio 1913 players
F.C. Crotone players
F.C. Pro Vercelli 1892 players
U.S. Salernitana 1919 players
S.S. Lazio players
F.C. Südtirol players
Serie A players
Serie B players
Serie C players
Footballers from Lombardy
People from Brianza